The following is the 1966–67 network television schedule for the three major English language commercial broadcast networks in the United States. The schedule covers primetime hours from September 1966 through August 1967. The schedule is followed by a list per network of returning series, new series, and series cancelled after the 1965–66 season.

New fall series are highlighted in bold.

Each of the 30 highest-rated shows is listed with its rank and rating as determined by Nielsen Media Research.

 Yellow indicates the programs in the top 10 for the season.
 Cyan indicates the programs in the top 20 for the season.
 Magenta indicates the programs in the top 30 for the season.

Note: This is the first full season in which practically all prime time programs were broadcast in color.

NET or National Educational Television, was in operation, but the schedule was set by each affiliated station.

Sunday 

Note: On NBC, Animal Secrets consisted of reruns of the series, which originally aired on Saturday afternoons from October 1966 to April 1967.

Monday 

Note: To Tell the Truth replaced The Jean Arthur Show on December 12. Captain Nice replaced The Roger Miller Show on NBC on  January 9, the same night the similar Mister Terrific replaced Run, Buddy, Run on CBS. Both series were cancelled by their respective networks at the end of the season.

Tuesday 

Note: The Pruitts of Southampton was renamed as The Phyllis Diller Show starting on January 13, 1967.

Wednesday

Thursday 

Note: The Tammy Grimes Show lasted only four weeks and was replaced by The Dating Game on October 6.

Friday 

(*) Formerly known as The Pruitts of Southampton

Saturday

By network

ABC

Returning Series
12 O'Clock High
ABC Scope
The ABC Sunday Night Movie
The Avengers
Batman
Bewitched
The Big Valley
Combat!
Dark Shadows
The Dating Game
F Troop
The F.B.I.
The Fugitive
The Hollywood Palace
The King Family Show
The Lawrence Welk Show
Peyton Place
Saga of Western Man
Texaco Star Theatre (moved from NBC)
Voyage to the Bottom of the Sea

New Series
ABC Stage 67
The ABC Wednesday Night Movie
Felony Squad
The Green Hornet
Hawk
The Invaders *
Iron Horse
Love on a Rooftop
Malibu U *
The Man Who Never Was
The Monroes
The Newlywed Game
The Picadilly Palace *
The Pruitts of Southampton
Rango *
The Rat Patrol
The Rounders
Shane
The Tammy Grimes Show
That Girl
The Time Tunnel

Not returning from 1965–66:
The Addams Family
The Adventures of Ozzie and Harriet
Amos Burke — Secret Agent
The Baron
Ben Casey
Blue Light
Court Martial
The Donna Reed Show
The Double Life of Henry Phyfe
The Farmer's Daughter
The Flintstones
Gidget
Honey West
The Jimmy Dean Show
The Legend of Jesse James
The Long Hot Summer
A Man Called Shenandoah
McHale's Navy
O.K. Crackerby!
The Patty Duke Show
Shindig!
Tammy

CBS

Returning Series
The 21st Century
The Andy Griffith Show
The Beverly Hillbillies
CBS News Hour
CBS Reports
CBS Thursday Night Movie
Daktari
The Danny Kaye Show
The Ed Sullivan Show
The Garry Moore Show
Gilligan's Island
Gomer Pyle, U.S.M.C.
Green Acres
Gunsmoke
Hogan's Heroes
I've Got a Secret
The Jackie Gleason Show
Lassie
Lost in Space
The Lucy Show
My Three Sons
Petticoat Junction
The Red Skelton Hour
The Smothers Brothers Comedy Hour
To Tell the Truth
Vacation Playhouse
The Wild Wild West
What's My Line?

New Series
Away We Go *
The CBS Friday Night Movie
CBS Playhouse *
Coliseum *
Coronet Blue *
Family Affair
It's About Time
The Jean Arthur Show
Jericho
Mission: Impossible
Mr. Terrific *
Our Place *
Pistols 'n' Petticoats
Run, Buddy, Run *
The Smothers Brothers Comedy Hour *

Not returning from 1965–66:
Art Linkletter's Hollywood Talent Scouts
Candid Camera
Continental Showcase
The Dick Van Dyke Show
Dr. Kildare
The Face Is Familiar
Hazel
The Hippodrome
The John Gary Show
The Loner
The Munsters
My Favorite Martian
Perry Mason
Rawhide
Secret Agent
Slattery's People
The Smothers Brothers Show
The Smothers Brothers Summer Show
The Steve Lawrence Show
The Trials of O'Brien
Wayne & Shuster Take An Affectionate Look At...

NBC

Returning Series
Actuality Specials
The Andy Williams Show
Animal Secrets
The Bell Telephone Hour
Bob Hope Presents the Chrysler Theatre
Bonanza
Daniel Boone
The Dean Martin Show
Flipper
Get Smart
I Dream of Jeannie
I Spy
Kraft Music Hall
Laredo
Let's Make a Deal
The Man from U.N.C.L.E.
NBC Tuesday Night at the Movies
NBC Saturday Night at the Movies
Please Don't Eat the Daisies
Run for Your Life
The Virginian
Walt Disney's Wonderful World of Color

New Series
Captain Nice *
Dean Martin Summer Show Starring Your Host Vic Damone *
Dragnet 1967 *
The Girl from U.N.C.L.E.
The Hero
Hey, Landlord
The Monkees
Occasional Wife
The Road West *
The Roger Miller Show
The Saint *
Star Trek
Tarzan
T.H.E. Cat

Not returning from 1965–66:
Branded
Camp Runamuck
Chrysler Presents a Bob Hope Special
Convoy
Dr. Kildare
Hank
Hullabaloo
The John Forsythe Show
Mickie Finn's
Mister Roberts
Mona McCluskey
My Mother the Car
The Wackiest Ship in the Army

Note: The * indicates that the program was introduced in midseason.

References

Additional sources
 Castleman, H. & Podrazik, W. (1982). Watching TV: Four Decades of American Television. New York: McGraw-Hill. 314 pp.
 McNeil, Alex. Total Television. Fourth edition. New York: Penguin Books. .
 Brooks, Tim & Marsh, Earle (2007). The Complete Directory to Prime Time Network and Cable TV Shows (9th ed.). New York: Ballantine. .
Shubilla, Thom "Beefstew" (2022). Primetime 1966-1967: The Full Spectrum Television's First All-Color Season. McFarland .

United States primetime network television schedules
1966 in American television
1967 in American television